Doctor Cyber is a fictional character appearing in DC Comics publications and related media, commonly as a recurring adversary of the superhero Wonder Woman. She first appeared late in the Silver Age of Comics in 1968's Wonder Woman (volume 1) #179, written by Dennis O'Neil and illustrated by Mike Sekowsky and Dick Giordano.

In her Silver Age appearances, Dr. Cyber was the brilliant head of a vast global criminal network. Beautiful, vain and possibly British or of Asian descent (or both), she initially blended aspects of the femme fatale and dragon lady character tropes. Subsequent Bronze Age appearances incorporated science fiction elements: after her face was disfigured in an accident, Dr. Cyber donned an eerie muzzle-mask and a technologically advanced exoskeleton. These cybernetic enhancements increased her physical strength, and gave her the ability to absorb energy, as well as to redirect it by firing blasts from her hands. Despite the resulting upgrades to her power, Dr. Cyber's disfigurement also wrought a mounting emotional instability: she became obsessed with recapturing her beauty by transferring her mind into Wonder Woman's body, a project she attempted several times with the help of her operative Doctor Moon.

After DC Comics rebooted its continuity in 1985 (a publication event known as the Crisis on Infinite Earths), Wonder Woman, her supporting cast and foes were re-imagined. Though originally absent from this revised mythos, Doctor Cyber would be reintroduced to the DC Comics canon in 2002, not in a Wonder Woman comic, but in issue #1 of Kurt Busiek and Tom Gummett's The Power Company, as the first arch-nemesis of the eponymous super-team. In DC's post-Rebirth era, the character would be reimagined as a powerful artificial intelligence with the memory and blithe personality of Dr. Adrianna Anderson, the deceased research and business partner of Wonder Woman's adversary Veronica Cale.

Fictional character biography

Pre-Crisis

Doctor Cyber was the beautiful and commanding presence behind a global criminal network around the same time when Wonder Woman had relinquished her powers when her fellow Amazons retreated into another dimension. Prior to Cyber's first encounter with the depowered Amazon, her henchmen plundered the monastery of I Ching for the gems and precious metals within and slaughtered the resisting monks. Colonel Steve Trevor unsuccessfully attempted to infiltrate Cyber's network, but learned of their plot: to create chaos within the US government by sending bombs inside toys to the children of Congressmen. This plot was actually a ruse to divert attention from a London jewel heist, foiled by Wonder Woman and I Ching. Doctor Cyber escaped only to resurface in Hong Kong several weeks later.

In Hong Kong, Doctor Cyber's plan was to destroy the city and blackmail the world with a series of devices that could create earthquakes. Cyber lured the non-powered Diana Prince to the Asian city hoping to entice her into joining the organization, which she steadfastly refused. Soon afterward, an attack by the rival Tiger Tong gang resulted in an urn of hot coals spilling onto Cyber's face. The villainess was evacuated to a secret hospital outside of Hong Kong, swearing revenge on Diana Prince for her disfigurement. Prince stopped the earthquake plot and Cyber was believed killed when her final earthquake device exploded.

When Diana Prince teamed up with private detective Jonny Double to stop an organization called the Tribunal, she discovered that Doctor Cyber had survived their previous encounter. Cyber had created the Tribunal to find a suitable woman to transplant her brain and replace her disfigured body. After Prince's capture, Cyber unsuccessfully attempted to have her brain transplanted into Diana by Doctor Moon. During this encounter, Cyber was accidentally impaled by a scalpel and believed killed once again.

On an assignment at a Catskill Mountain resort as Diana Prince, Wonder Woman again discovered that Doctor Cyber had cheated death. While investigating a number of murders at the resort, Cyber battled Wonder Woman after an unsuccessful attempt to graft the Amazon's face onto her own. The ensuing melée ended with Cyber seemingly falling to her death from atop a ski lift.

Doctor Cyber laid low for several months before capturing Wonder Girl in another attempt to capture Wonder Woman for a brain transplant. Wonder Woman agreed to trade her life for her adopted sister, but both were rescued by the Teen Titans. Cyber and her partner, Dr. Moon, were finally captured.

It is unknown if Doctor Cyber was released or escaped from custody, but she disguised herself as Diana Prince, infiltrated the Pentagon, and stole the launch codes to America's nuclear missiles. Wonder Woman averted the attempted nuclear war, but Cyber was killed attempting to flee from her and Steve Trevor (disguised as the god Eros) when her rocket sled crashed into the side of a cliff.

During the Crisis on Infinite Earths, Brainiac assumedly retrieved Doctor Cyber sometime prior to her death and assigned her to team-up with several other villains to conquer Earth-S. Doctor Cyber was finally excised from the DC Universe after the conclusion of Crisis.

Post-Crisis

The second Doctor Cyber first appeared, chronologically, in post-Crisis continuity in The Power Company #1 (February 2002).

Cyber, together with several other scientific geniuses and robotic beings (Automan, Brainstorm, Emil Hamilton, Ford, and Rosie the Riveter), was for a brief period part of the composite cybernetic being called Enginehead. However (if this story is still canon), the being seems to have been divided into the individual personalities again shortly after the events of the series.

Cyber is later shown re-introduced into the Wonder Woman comic by battling Donna Troy (the new Wonder Woman) and Cassie Sandsmark (the current Wonder Girl).

During the Infinite Crisis storyline, Doctor Cyber popped up as a member of Alexander Luthor, Jr.'s Secret Society of Super Villains.

DC Rebirth
After the events of DC Rebirth, Doctor Cyber was reintroduced as Dr. Adrianna Anderson, a research scientist for Empire Industries and a close friend to the company's CEO, Veronica Cale. Soon after Diana left Themyscira and returned Steve Trevor to the United States, Cale's daughter Isadore was kidnapped by the gods Deimos and Phobos. To reclaim her soul, the twin gods ordered Cale and Anderson to use the experimental Cyberwalker system to find the location of Themyscira from Wonder Woman. Adrianna immediately volunteered to use the Cyberwalker suit out of fear of losing her only friend. Connected to the Cyberwalker, Adrianna battled Wonder Woman, but the Cyberwalker suit began to malfunction with Adrianna's mind trapped inside. Despite efforts by Veronica Cale to save her friend, Adrianna died.

Over a year later, Veronica Cale created an artificial construct of Adrianna using what was left of her neural map in the Cyberwalker system. After learning that her physical body had died, Adrianna chose to take the name Doctor Cyber. Veronica recruited Doctor Cyber into helping her get her daughter back. She was instrumental in the transformation of Barbara Ann Minerva into becoming the Cheetah by disabling the GPS signaling device Wonder Woman had given her, as well as keeping Wonder Woman distracted with various disasters so that she would be unable to save Minerva. Doctor Cyber also later aided Veronica Cale in summoning the witch Circe to transform Deimos and Phobos into dogs.

As the search for Themyscira grew, Doctor Cyber worked as a member of Veronica Cale's Godwatch organization, often sharing intel with Doctor Poison and her agents. She also participated in the coercion of Barbara Ann Minerva returning to her Cheetah form. When Wonder Woman and her allies journeyed to Veronica Cale's home for answers, they were confronted by Doctor Cyber, who revealed that she had been manipulating Diana for years. She accused Wonder Woman for murdering her by bringing her gods with her. After several taunts, her computers are smashed and destroyed by Ferdinand the Minotaur.

Meanwhile, traveling over the Black Sea, Doctor Cyber apologized to Veronica Cale for not being able to stall Wonder Woman longer. After finally reuniting with Isadore, Veronica Cale returned to her home where she dismissed Doctor Cyber as being simply an AI created from Adrianna Anderson. After erasing their illegal tracks, Doctor Cyber left Veronica Cale.

Some time later, Doctor Cyber returned to Empire Industries to help Veronica Cale capture the Cheetah.

Powers and abilities
The first Doctor Cyber had no powers but wore an armored suit that allowed her to physically fight Wonder Woman on near-equal terms. The suit enhanced her strength and endurance and also allowed her to redirect energy when fired at the suit. She also used a variety of weaponry that included laser pistols, mind control serum, an invisibility screen, rocket sleds, and myriad robot assassins. After her disfigurement she often used plain and unattractive women as henchmen so as not to be reminded of her lost beauty.

The second Doctor Cyber also wore an armored suit, but while its full abilities and limitations are as yet unknown, in keeping with her name they are more implicitly cybernetic in nature. As her limbs were able to stretch to impossible lengths it does seem that she is a cyborg and not merely a person in armor.

Post-Rebirth, Doctor Cyber developed a device that would enable her to remotely interface with mechanical components. This automated robotics system could physically interface with the neurological mechanics of the brain from a world away, but ran the risk of subsuming a human mind who piloted it in the virtual reality.

After her body died, Veronica uploaded whats left of her neural imprint from the C.Y.B.E.R system into a computer interface, Adriana now functioned primarily as an artificial intelligence being. She used metallic spheres to emit holograms of her physical appearance, often changing them at will to reflect her sarcastic attitude. She had access to the majority of technology in the world, able to transfer into and hack digitized equipment instantaneously.

Other versions

Wonder Woman: Black and Gold
Doctor Cyber appears in the anthology series Wonder Woman: Black & Gold. In the story "How the Wonder Woman Was Brought Low by a Mouse But Captured the Stars" by Kurt Busiek, Doctor Cyber teamed up with Mouse Man to free the Human Firework from a secure laboratory. She is defeated when Wonder Woman goads Firework to use his powers to explode, knocking her out of the battle.

In other media

Television
Doctor Cyber makes minor non-speaking appearances in Justice League Unlimited as a member of Gorilla Grodd's Secret Society. Prior to and during the episode "Alive!", Lex Luthor takes over the Society, but Grodd mounts a mutiny. Cyber sides with the latter, but is frozen by Killer Frost and killed by Darkseid along with Grodd's other loyalists.

Film
Doctor Cyber appears in Wonder Woman: Bloodlines, voiced by Mozhan Marnò. This version is an artificial intelligence and co-leader of Villainy Inc. They search for Themyscira and resurrect Medusa to invade the island for the goal of stealing their technology for profit, but the Gorgon betrays them and destroys Cyber.

Video games
Doctor Cyber appears as an assist character in Scribblenauts Unmasked: A DC Comics Adventure.

Miscellaneous
 Doctor Cyber appears in issue #4 of the Batman: The Brave and the Bold tie-in comic book.
 Doctor Cyber appears in issue #24 of the DC Super Friends tie-in comic book.
 Gloria Marquez, who previously appeared in the Wonder Woman (1975) TV series, is revealed to be Doctor Cyber in Wonder Woman '77 Meets The Bionic Woman.

See also
 List of Wonder Woman enemies

References

Fictional inventors
Fictional female royalty
Fictional artificial intelligences
DC Comics robots
Fictional businesspeople
Fictional mad scientists
Fictional cyborgs
DC Comics cyborgs
DC Comics scientists
Characters created by Dennis O'Neil
Characters created by Mike Sekowsky
Wonder Woman characters
Comics characters introduced in 1968
Cyber